The 1991 Copa Libertadores Final was a two-legged football match-up to determine the 1991 Copa Libertadores champion. It was contested between Olimpia of Paraguay and Club Social y Deportivo Colo-Colo of Chile.

Colo-Colo won 3–0 on aggregate score and became the first Chilean football team to win an official international competition. These finals were the last ones not to show either an Argentine nor a Brazilian team competed up to the 2016 edition.

Qualified teams

Venues

Match details

First leg

Second leg

External links
CONMEBOL's official website

1
Copa Libertadores Finals
Copa Libertadores Final 1991
Copa Libertadores Final 1991
Copa